Ağrı Spor Kulübü, colloquially known as Ağrı or simply Ağrıspor, is a Turkish professional football club located in Ağrı. The club competes at TFF Third League as of 2021–22 season.

Team records

League affiliation
TFF Third League: 2019–
Turkish Regional Amateur League: 2016–2019
Super Amateur Leagues: 2015–2016

Honours
Turkish Regional Amateur League
Play-off winners:  2018–19
Group winners: 2017–18
Super Amateur Leagues
 Ağrı 1st Amateur League winners: 2015–16

References

External links
Official website
Ağrı 1970 SK at TFF

Association football clubs established in 1970
1970 establishments in Turkey
TFF Third League clubs
Ağrı